Evelyn Vanderhoop (born in 1953) is a Native American artist of Haida descent who is both a watercolorist and master weaver.

Her work is on display in the Burke Museum of Natural History and Culture, the Museum of Fine Arts, Boston, and the  Canadian Museum of History.

Early life and education 
Vanderhoop was born in 1953. She has a Bachelor of Arts degree from Western Washington University, Bellingham, Washington.

Career 
In her early career, she worked primarily as a painter, transitioning later into working as a textile artist. Her art practice includes researching and sharing cultural knowledge of Haida history. Vanderhoop creates traditional Northern Northwest Coast art textiles, following in the tradition of her mother Delores Churchill and grandmother Selina Peratrovich, both master weavers.

Her work can be found in the collections of Burke Museum of Natural History and Culture and The Haida Gwaii Museum, Skidegate, British Columbia. 

In 2011, the Canadian Museum of History commissioned her to wave Sqalra Qwii Ghaalgyaat (English: Ripples in the Sky Robe) Raven's Tail Robe. She collaborated with her mother (Delores Churchill) and her two daughters.

In 2017, the Museum of Fine Arts, Boston commissioned a Raven's Tail dance robe from the artist.

Family life 
Vanderhoop has two daughters, Carrie-Anne Vanderhoop Bellis and Tifffany Amber Vanderhoop Haida.

References 

Living people
20th-century Native Americans
American textile artists
Haida artists
Native American women artists
Women textile artists
1953 births
20th-century Native American women
21st-century American women
Western Washington University alumni